Jill Morford is a professor of linguistics at the University of New Mexico, United States.

The central focus of her research is to inform our understanding of language acquisition by studying communication in the visual modality.

External links
 Faculty page at the University of New Mexico

Linguists from the United States
Women linguists
Linguists of sign languages
Living people
Year of birth missing (living people)
Place of birth missing (living people)
University of New Mexico faculty